"Wall of Tears" is a song written by Richard Leigh and Peter McCann. It was originally recorded by American country music artist Gus Hardin and was the title track of her 1984 album. The song was also recorded by American country music artist K. T. Oslin. It was released in December 1986 as the first single from Oslin's album 80's Ladies. The song reached #40 on the Billboard Hot Country Singles & Tracks chart.

Background and release
"Wall of Tears" was co-written by Nashville songwriters, Richard Leigh and Peter McCann. Its first known version was recorded by Gus Hardin in the summer of 1984. Hardin's session took place at the Music Mill recording studio, which was located in Nashville, Tennessee. The song's recording was produced by Mark Wright. He would serve as Hardin's producer for the eventual album the song was included on. The song was eventually released as an album track following the release of the album. Hardin's album was named after the song and was never released as a single. On the original vinyl record, "Wall of Tears," was included as the second song on "side two" of the project.

Personnel
All credits are adapted from the liner notes of Wall of Tears by Gus Hardin.

Musical personnel
 Eddie Bayers – drums
 Barry Beckett – piano
 Kathy Burdick – background vocals
 Kim Fleming – background vocals
 Emory Gordy, Jr. – bass
 Gus Hardin – lead vocals
 Shane Keister – synthesizer
 Dave Loggins – background vocals
 Jay Dee Manners – steel guitar
 Brent Rowan – guitar
 Jim Scaife – background vocals
 Wendy Weldman – background vocals
 Mark Wright – background vocals, producer

K. T. Oslin version

Background and content
In 1982, K. T. Oslin had originally recorded two singles with Elektra Records, both of which were unsuccessful. She was ultimately dropped from the label, but gained a second recording contract with RCA Victor in 1986. It was at RCA that Oslin would have her biggest commercial success as a country artist.  Oslin would record "Wall of Tears" in her first studio session with RCA. The session was produced by Jim Cotton and Joe Scaife. It took place at the Music Mill Studio, in October 1986. The track "Old Pictures" was also cut at the same session.

Release and reception
"Wall of Tears" was released as a single via RCA Victor Records in December 1986. It would be her first RCA release. It was distributed as a seven inch single, with the B-side being "Two Hearts Are Better Than You." The song spent 15 weeks on the Billboard Hot Country Songs chart between 1986 and 1987. By February 1987, the single had climbed to number 40 on the country chart. "Wall of Tears" became Oslin's second charting single and her first to break into the top 40. Her next single, "80's Ladies," would be her first major hit. 

"Wall of Tears" would later be released on Oslin's debut studio album, which was also titled 80's Ladies. The album was released in 1987 and the song was the album's opening track. In discussing the album's material, Rodney Batdorf of Allmusic noted Oslin's style, which included her sound on "Wall of Tears": "K.T. Oslin established a new voice in country music -- that of an upscale, middle-aged divorcee, trying to cope with the turmoils with life."

Track listings
7" vinyl single
 "Wall of Tears" – 3:40
 "Two Hearts Are Better Than You" – 4:43

Chart performance

Personnel
All credits are adapted from the liner notes of 80's Ladies.

Musical personnel
K. T. Oslin – keyboards, lead vocals, backing vocals
David Briggs – keyboards 
Gary Prim – keyboards
Costo Davis – synthesizer
Bruce Dees – electric guitar
Steve Gibson – electric guitar
Brent Rowan – acoustic guitar, electric guitar
Mike Brignardello – bass guitar
Larry Paxton – bass guitar
Eddie Bayers – drums
Larrie Londin – drums
James Stroud – drums
Sam Levine – saxophone
Terry McMillan – harmonica
Joe Scaife – backing vocals

References

1984 songs
1986 singles
Gus Hardin songs
K. T. Oslin songs
RCA Victor singles
Song recordings produced by Mark Wright (record producer)
Songs written by Richard Leigh (songwriter)
Songs written by Peter McCann